William Edgar Buchanan II (March 20, 1903  – April 4, 1979) was an American actor with a long career in both film and television. He is most familiar today as Uncle Joe Carson from the Petticoat Junction, Green Acres, and The Beverly Hillbillies television sitcoms of the 1960s.

Biography

Early life
The son of Dr. and Mrs. William Edgar Buchanan, he was born in Humansville, Missouri, on March 20, 1903. He moved with his family to Oregon when he was seven. In 1928, he earned a DDS degree from North Pacific College School of Dentistry, which later became Oregon Health & Science University School of Dentistry. His wife Mildred (1907–1987) and he, classmates in dental school, were married in 1928, the year he graduated. They had one child, a son named Buck. In 1939, they moved from Eugene, Oregon, to Altadena, California, where they relocated their dental practice. He joined the Pasadena Playhouse as an actor. He appeared in his first film in 1939, at the age of 36, after which he turned his dentistry practice over to his wife. He was a member of Theta Chi fraternity and a Freemason.

Career
Buchanan appeared in more than 100 films, including Texas (1941), in which  he played a dentist and appeared with William Holden and Glenn Ford and later in Penny Serenade (1941) with Irene Dunne and Cary Grant, Tombstone, the Town Too Tough to Die (1942), The Talk of the Town (1942) with Ronald Colman and Jean Arthur, The Man from Colorado (1948), Cheaper by the Dozen (1950), Shane (1953), She Couldn't Say No (1954), Ride the High Country (1962) with Randolph Scott and Joel McCrea, McLintock! (1963) with John Wayne, Move Over, Darling (1963) with Doris Day and James Garner, and Benji (1974).

Among the many television series in which he was cast as a guest star were Cimarron City, The Californians, and The Rifleman. Edgar appeared in six episodes of The Rifleman, playing Grandpa Fogerty in "The Long Goodbye" (episode 119) and Doc Burrage in the other five: "The Pet" (episode 15), "The Second Witness" (episode 23), "The Trade" (episode 24), "The Deadly Wait" (episode 26), and "The Angry Man" (episode 31). In addition to several other widely varying roles on the series (running the gamut from sympathetic parts to vicious villains), he portrayed Jed Christianson in the episode "Duel at Sundown" on Maverick with James Garner and Clint Eastwood. He was on Leave It to Beaver (as both "Uncle Billy" and "Captain Jack"), The Twilight Zone, Riverboat (as Wingate Pardee in the 1960 episode, "Duel on the River"), Gunsmoke, Route 66, Bringing Up Buddy, Bus Stop, and The Lloyd Bridges Show.

Buchanan's roles as a regular cast member in television programs included Red Connors in the syndicated  Western Hopalong Cassidy, and  J.J. Jackson in the CBS crime drama Cade's County.

Buchanan appeared as Uncle Joe Carson in all 222 episodes of Petticoat Junction, the only actor from the show to do so, as well as in 17 episodes of Green Acres, and three episodes of The Beverly Hillbillies. On Petticoat Junction, he took over as proprietor of the Shady Rest Hotel following the 1968 death of show star Bea Benaderet, who had played Kate Bradley; Buchanan had starred as second lead since the series' inception. In the 1966 episode "The All-Night Party" and in the 1969 episode "Kathy Jo's First Birthday Party", he appeared with his real-life son, Buck (who had a cameo as a party goer and an ice cream vendor, respectively). Another star from Petticoat Junction and he appeared together in the 1974 movie Benji; the other "star" was Higgins the dog, which portrayed the title character.

Buchanan appeared in multiple episodes of "Tales of Wells Fargo," starring Dale Robertson.  He had the recurring role of a rascally ex-outlaw named Doc Dawson.

In 1967, Dot Records released "Phantom 309" (Dot #17047), a narration by Buchanan. The 45-rpm single was backed with "Cotton Picker".

Death
Buchanan died from a stroke complicated by pneumonia in Palm Desert, California, and was interred in the Forest Lawn - Hollywood Hills Cemetery in Los Angeles.

Filmography

Television

References

Further reading

External links

 
 
 
 

1903 births
1979 deaths
American male film actors
American male television actors
Male Western (genre) film actors
American dentists
People from Humansville, Missouri
Male actors from Missouri
Burials at Forest Lawn Memorial Park (Hollywood Hills)
Male actors from Los Angeles
University of Oregon alumni
20th-century American male actors
Western (genre) television actors
20th-century dentists
Deaths from pneumonia in California